Molgulidae  is a family of tunicates in the class Ascidiacea. Following a revision in 2007, the family Hexacrobylidae was synonymized with Molgulidae.

Genera
The World Register of Marine Species lists the following genera:

Anomopera Hartmeyer, 1923
Asajirus  Kott, 1989
Bostrichobranchus  Traustedt, 1883
Eugyra  Alder & Hancock, 1870
Fungulus  Herdman, 1882
Gamaster  Pizon, 1896
Minipera  Monniot & Monniot, 1974
Molgula  Forbes, 1848
Molguloides  Huntsman, 1922
Namiella  Monniot & Monniot, 1968
Oligotrema  Bourne, 1903
Paramolgula  Traustedt, 1835
Pareugyrioides  Hartmeyer, 1914
Protomolgula  Monniot, 1971
Rhizomolgula  Ritter, 1901

References

Stolidobranchia
Tunicate families